Slim Whitman Sings is a studio album by Slim Whitman, released in 1959 on Imperial Records.

Release history 
The album was issued in the United States by Imperial Records as a 12-inch long-playing record, catalog number LP-9064.

In November 1959, it was issued in the UK by London Records, catalog number HA-P 2199.

There is also a U.S. reissue under the title Country Favorites.

In 2012, the album was issued in the UK on CD by Hallmark Music & Entertainment, catalog number 712282.

Track listing

References 

1959 albums
Slim Whitman albums
Imperial Records albums